Corn snacks are snack foods made from corn (maize). They are often marketed, packaged and flavoured in a similar way to potato crisps.

Extruded 
Extruded corn snacks come in "puffed" and "crunchy" varieties.  They include:
Puffcorn
Cheese puffs and varieties (cheese curls, cheese balls, etc.)
Seasoned "fries" such as Andy Capp's fries
 Umaibō, cylindrical corn snack from Japan

Chips 
Corn chips
Tortilla chips
Rolled corn chips, such as Takis

Other 
Corn nuts
Popcorn

Maize dishes